Allensville is an unincorporated community in Cotton Township, Switzerland County, in the U.S. state of Indiana.

It is located on Indiana State Road 250 just west of East Enterprise.

History
A post office was established at Allensville in 1823, and remained in operation until it was discontinued in 1908.

Geography

References

Unincorporated communities in Switzerland County, Indiana
Unincorporated communities in Indiana